Perth Phoenix B.C. is a Scottish basketball club, based in the city of Perth, Scotland.

History
The club was founded in 2003 by a group of locals, initially only as a senior men's team. The club now supports six boys and girls youth teams, four of which compete in their respective National Leagues.

Home Venue
North Inch Community Campus
Perth High School
Perth Academy
Perth College UHI

Season-by-season records

References

Basketball teams in Scotland
2003 establishments in Scotland
Basketball teams established in 2003
Sport in Perth, Scotland